Pampa Film was an Argentine film production company that was active in the 1930s and 1940s. It is known for its classic Prisioneros de la tierra (1939).

History

Pampa Film was founded in January 1937 by Warner Bros. in partnership with the local entrepreneur Olegario Ferrando. 
The company used the Lumiton facilities at first, and Lumiton was to distribute its films.
Later the link with Lumiton was severed.

Luis Saslavsky directed Sueño de Una Vide Nueva for Pampa Film, released in Argentina as La fuga by Warner Bros. on 28 July 1937 with music by César Gola. 
It was one of the hits of the year.
Jorge Luis Borges praised the romantic comedy, saying it did not "suffer from fruitless images" but flowed "the way American films do."
In La fuga Amelia Bence supported Tita Merello and Santiago Arrieta. 
Her performance earned Bence a contract at Pampa Film and three other film appearances.

On 17 August 1939 Pampa Film released Prisioneros de la tierra, directed by Mario Soffici and starring Ángel Magaña, Francisco Petrone, Eliza Gálvez, Raúl Lange, Homero Cárpena and Roberto Fugazot.
The highly successful film, based on short stories by Horacio Quiroga, has become a classic.
The Argentine film historian Domingo di Núbila has called the genre launched by this film "social folkloric". It inspired many later filmmakers in Argentina, although in the short term the industry did not take up the challenge.

Filmography

La fuga 1937
Los caranchos de la Florida 1938
Nativa 1939
...Y los sueños pasan 1939
Prisioneros de la tierra 1939
Encadenado 1940
La carga de los valientes (Only the Valiant) 1940
Chingolo 1940
La quinta calumnia 1941
El mozo número 13 1941
El cura gaucho (The Gaucho Priest) 1941
Yo quiero morir contigo (I Want to Die with You) 1941
Stella 1943
Oro en la mano (Gold in the Hand) 1943
Siete mujeres 1944
La Casta Susana 1944
Villa rica del Espíritu Santo 1945
Lauracha 1946
Chiruca 1948

Notes

Sources

Mass media companies established in 1937
Film production companies of Argentina
1937 in Argentina